Ihor Volodymyrovych Klymenko (born 25 October 1972) is a Ukrainian police general serving as the minister of internal affairs since 7 February 2023 (acting since 18 January). He succeeded Denys Monastyrsky following his death in a helicopter crash. He had been the chief of the National Police of Ukraine from 25 September 2019 until 19 January 2023.

Biography 
Klymenko was born on 25 October 1972 in Kyiv, Ukrainian SSR, USSR. He graduated from  Kharkiv Military University and  Odesa University. He gained a master's degree from Dnipropetrovsk State University of Internal Affairs. 

From 1994–1997 he served in the Ukrainian Ground Forces as part of the 459th Missile Brigade of the 8th Army Corps. Since 1998, he has served in the Ministry of Internal Affairs. 

In 2013, he defended his Ph.D. thesis in psychology, and in 2019, his doctoral thesis. 

From December 2011 to March 2014, he was the head of the Department of Professional Training and Education of the Ministry of Internal Affairs of Ukraine.

In 2015, he headed the Human Resources Department of the National Police of Ukraine, in 2017 he was appointed Deputy Head of this Department, and in 2019 - Head of the National Police. 

On January 18, 2023, he was appointed Deputy Minister of Internal Affairs of Ukraine and Acting Minister. The appointment took place after the death of Denys Monastyrsky in a helicopter crash. On 7 February 2023 parliament appointed Klymenko Minister of Internal Affairs of Ukraine. 321 deputies (of the total 411) voted for the relevant resolution. Klymenko received no support from European Solidarity and only 1 vote from Holos.

References 

1972 births
Living people
Ukrainian police officers
People from Kyiv
Odesa University alumni
Government ministers of Ukraine
Interior ministers of Ukraine